Qush Qayeh (also Romanized as Qūsh Qayeh; also known as Qūsh Qayehsī) is a village in Leylan-e Shomali Rural District of Leylan District, Malekan County, East Azerbaijan province, Iran. At the 2006 National Census, its population was 835 in 177 households. The following census in 2011 counted 991 people in 251 households. The latest census in 2016 showed a population of 940 people in 265 households; it was the largest village in its rural district.

References 

Malekan County

Populated places in East Azerbaijan Province

Populated places in Malekan County